Union Township is one of thirteen townships in Jasper County, Indiana, United States. As of the 2010 census, its population was 1,586 and it contained 579 housing units.

Union Township was founded in 1868.

Geography

Unincorporated towns
 Aix
 Fair Oaks
 Moffitt
 Parr
 Rosebud
 Virgie

Adjacent townships
 Keener Township (north)
 Barkley Township (east)
 Walker Township (east)
 Marion Township (southeast)
 Newton Township (south)
 Colfax Township, Newton County (west)
 Lincoln Township, Newton County (northwest)

Cemeteries
The township contains one cemetery, Yeoman.

Major highways
  Interstate 65
  U.S. Route 231
  Indiana State Road 14

References
 U.S. Board on Geographic Names (GNIS)
 United States Census Bureau cartographic boundary files

Education
Union Township residents are eligible to obtain a free library card from the Jasper County Public Library.

External links
 Indiana Township Association
 United Township Association of Indiana

Townships in Jasper County, Indiana
Townships in Indiana